The Parliament Act 1949 (12, 13 & 14 Geo. 6 c. 103) is an Act of the Parliament of the United Kingdom. It reduced the power of the House of Lords to delay certain types of legislation – specifically public bills other than money bills – by amending the Parliament Act 1911.

This Act is interpreted as one with the Parliament Act 1911. This Act, and that Act, may be cited together as the "Parliament Acts 1911 and 1949".

Parliament Act 1911
The 1911 Act placed the relationship between the House of Commons and House of Lords on a new footing, removing the power of the Lords to veto money bills.

Other public bills could be delayed for up to two years. This two-year period meant that legislation introduced in the fourth or fifth years of a parliament could be delayed until after the next election, which could prove an effective measure to prevent its being passed. Specifically, two years had to elapse between the second reading in the House of Commons in the first session and the passing of the bill in the House of Commons in the third session.

Effects of 1949 Act
The 1949 Act amended the 1911 Act, reducing this delay to a single year. Section 2 defined the act's short title as the "Parliament Act 1949" and stated that the Parliament Acts 1911 and 1949 should be construed together as one under that name.

Legal challenge
In Jackson v Attorney General, the validity of the Parliament Act 1949 was questioned because it used the 1911 Act to ensure its passage. The challenge asserted that the 1949 Act was delegated rather than primary legislation, and that the 1911 Act had delegated power to the Commons. If this were the case, then the Commons could not empower itself through the 1949 Act without direct permission from the Lords. Since it was passed under the 1911 Act, it had never received the required consent of the Lords. However, the 1949 Act was found to be legal. It was concluded that the 1911 Act was not primarily about empowering the Commons, but rather was about restricting the ability of the Lords to affect legislation. This ruling also meant that efforts to abolish the House of Lords using the Acts could be successful, although the issue was not directly addressed in the ruling.

See also
List of Acts of the Parliament of the United Kingdom enacted without the House of Lords' consent

Further reading
Digital reproduction of the Original Act on the Parliamentary Archives catalogue

References

Case law

Citations

Bibliography

1949 in law
Constitutional laws of the United Kingdom
Parliament of the United Kingdom
United Kingdom Acts of Parliament 1949
December 1949 events in the United Kingdom
Acts of the Parliament of the United Kingdom concerning the House of Lords